Limbongan was a neighbourhood in Kampong Ayer, the riverine stilt settlement in Bandar Seri Begawan, the capital of Brunei. It was officially a village subdivision under Tamoi, a mukim (subdistrict) of Brunei-Muara District, and had the postcode BL1312. Limbongan was one of the traditional stilt neighbourhoods which had existed along the banks of the Kedayan River, a tributary of the Brunei River in the vicinity of Kampong Ayer, before they were eventually demolished in the 2010s and redeveloped into Taman Mahkota Jubli Emas, a riverfront park.

Etymology 
"Limbongan" is the former spelling of the Malay word "" which literally means 'dockyard'.

References 

Limbongan